Preetha Jayaraman is an Indian cinematographer. She is the niece of famous cinematographer P.C. Sreeram. Jayaraman was largely inspired by her uncle's work on field and later became an established Cinematographer. She has ranging experience from shooting TVCs, music videos, short films, documentaries and feature films. Her frequent collaboration is with Prakash Raj. She came to limelight when she had worked for Abhiyum Naanum. In 2019, she won the "Best Cinematography Award" at the Wonder Women Awards. She is one of the first 4 women to be inducted into the Indian Society of Cinematographers.

Filmography

References 

Year of birth missing (living people)
Living people
Indian women cinematographers
Kannada film cinematographers
Tamil film cinematographers
Film people from Tamil Nadu
Artists from Chennai